The 1981 Spanish coup d'état attempt, known in Spain by the numeronym 23-F and also known as the Tejerazo, was an attempted coup d'état or putsch in Spain on 23 February 1981. Lieutenant-Colonel Antonio Tejero led 200 armed Civil Guard officers into the Congress of Deputies during the vote to elect a President of the Government. The officers held the parliamentarians and ministers hostage for 18 hours, during which time King Juan Carlos I denounced the coup in a televised address, calling for rule of law and the democratic government to continue. The royal address fatally undermined the coup. Though shots were fired, the hostage-takers surrendered the next morning without killing anyone.

Background
The coup attempt was linked to the Spanish transition to democracy. Four factors generated tensions that the governing Democratic Center Union (UCD) coalition of conservative parties could not contain:

 almost 20% unemployment, capital flight, and 16% inflation, which were caused by an economic crisis
 difficulty devolving governance to Spanish regions
 increased violence by the Basque terrorist group ETA
 opposition to the fledgling democracy from within the Spanish Armed Forces

The first signs of unease in the army appeared in April 1977. Admiral Pita da Veiga resigned as Navy minister and formed the Superior Council of the Army. This was a result of Da Veiga's disagreement with the legalisation of the Communist Party of Spain (PCE) on 9 April 1977, following the Atocha massacre by neo-fascist terrorists. In November 1978, the Operation Galaxia military putsch was put down. Its leader, Lieutenant-Colonel Antonio Tejero, was sentenced to seven months in prison.

While seditious sentiments grew in sectors of the military and extreme right, the government faced a serious crisis at the beginning of the decade, and its position became increasingly untenable in the course of 1980. Key events saw the resignation of the Minister of Culture, Manuel Clavero on 15 January; the restructuring of the government on 3 May; the motion of no confidence against Adolfo Suarez moved by the Spanish Socialist Workers' Party (PSOE) between 28 May and 30 May; the resignation on 22 July of the vice-president, Fernando Abril Martorell, which produced a new reshuffle in September; and the election in October of Miguel Herrero Rodríguez de Miñón, alternative candidate of the official bid for president of the centrist parliamentary group promoted by Suárez.

The growing weakness of Suárez at the heart of his own party led to his televised resignation as prime minister and president of the UCD on 29 January 1981. On 1 February, the "Almendros Collective" published an openly insurgent article in the far-right newspaper El Alcázar, which was the mouthpiece of the Búnker hardliners, including Carlos Arias Navarro, Luis Carrero Blanco's successor as prime minister, and the leader of the francoist party Fuerza Nueva, Blas Piñar. From 2 to 4 February, the King and Queen traveled to Guernica, where the deputies of Basque separatist party Herri Batasuna received them with boos and hisses and various incidents. On 6 February, the chief engineer of the Lemoiz nuclear project, José María Ryan, was found murdered, having been kidnapped a few days earlier. Meanwhile, there was no further news about industrialist Luis Suñer after his abduction.

In this atmosphere of mounting tension, the process of choosing Suárez's successor began. Between 6 and 9 February, the 2nd UCD congress in Majorca made it clear that the party was unravelling and Agustín Rodríguez Sahagún was named acting prime minister.  On 10 February, Leopoldo Calvo Sotelo was named candidate for prime minister.

Political flashpoint
Tensions came to a head on 13 February, when news emerged of the torture and murder in Carabanchel of José Ignacio Arregui, a member of the Basque nationalist movement ETA, who had been held incommunicado for 10 days in the General Security Directorate (Dirección General de Seguridad). A general strike in the Basque region and an acrimonious debate between opposing parliamentary groups in the Congress followed. The government then dismissed various police chiefs, while in the Interior Ministry there were resignations in solidarity with the torturers. El Alcázar newspaper judged the government's actions a show of weakness that needed to be stopped.

Against this extraordinary backdrop, Calvo Sotelo presented his proposed government on 18 February, but, during congressional voting on the 20th, he failed to obtain the necessary majority approval for confirmation as prime minister, so a new vote was scheduled for the 23rd: the day the conspirators had chosen for their coup attempt. As planned, the coup would require Tejero and General Jaime Milans del Bosch as its principal instigators, with a minor role being played by General Alfonso Armada, a confidant of King Juan Carlos I.

Coup

Assault on the Congress of Deputies

Several TVE cameramen and technicians filmed almost half an hour of the event, providing the world with an audiovisual record of the attempted coup (which would be broadcast several hours after it ended). Moreover, members of the private radio station SER continued their live broadcast with open microphones from within the Congress of Deputies, which meant that the general public was able to follow along by radio as events unfolded. As such, the date is sometimes remembered as "the Night of Transistor Radios" (La noche de los transistores).

At 18:00, the roll-call vote for the swearing in (investidura) of Leopoldo Calvo-Sotelo as Prime Minister began in the Congress of Deputies. At 18:23, as Socialist-party deputy Manuel Núñez Encabo was standing up to cast his vote, 200 Guardia Civil agents led by Lieutenant-Colonel Antonio Tejero and armed with submachine guns, burst into congressional chambers. Tejero immediately took the Speaker's platform and shouted "¡Quieto todo el mundo!" ("Nobody move!"), ordering everyone to lie down on the floor.

Most of the deputies dropped to the floor, except for three: acting minister of defence and deputy prime minister General Manuel Gutiérrez Mellado, acting prime minister Adolfo Suárez, and Communist Party leader Santiago Carrillo, who calmly lit a cigarette and remained seated.

As the highest-ranking military official present, Army General (and Deputy Prime Minister) Gutiérrez Mellado refused to comply, confronting Tejero and ordering him to stand down and hand over the weapon. Outgoing Prime Minister Adolfo Suárez made a move to join Gutiérrez Mellado, who briefly scuffled with several civil guards until Tejero fired a shot into the air, which was followed by a sustained burst of submachine-gun fire from the assailants. (The shots wounded some of the visitors in the chamber's upper gallery). Undeterred, arms akimbo in defiance, 68-year-old General Gutiérrez Mellado refused to sit down, even after Tejero attempted, unsuccessfully, to wrestle him to the floor. Their face-off ended with Tejero returning to the rostrum and Gutiérrez Mellado returning to his seat.

After several minutes, all the deputies retook their assigned congressional seats. The captain of the Guardia Civil, strode to the Speaker's platform, demanded silence and announced that all those present were to wait for the arrival of "the competent military authority."

At 19:35, Prime Minister Suárez stood up and asked to speak to the commanders. Shots were fired in response, and a guard flashed a submachine gun towards the deputies' seats, demanding silence. One of the assailants ordered, "Mr. Suárez, stay in your seat!" Suárez was about to reply when someone else shouted, "siéntate maldita sea" ("Sit down, damn it!") (Historically, this phrase is attributed to Lieutenant Colonel Tejero, although it was probably Lieutenant Ramos Rueda.) Finally, Tejero grabbed Suárez by the arm and led him forcefully to a room outside the chamber. When Suárez demanded that Tejero explain "this madness"; Tejero's only reply was "¡todo por España!" ("Everything for Spain!"). When Suárez pressed the point, citing his authority as prime minister ("president of the government"), Tejero - using the informal "tú" - replied, "Tú ya no eres presidente de nada!" ("You are no longer the president of anything!")

Shortly afterward, five of the parliament's deputies were separated from the rest: Prime Minister Suárez; the opposition leader, Felipe González and his deputy, Alfonso Guerra González; Communist Party leader Santiago Carrillo; and the Defense minister, Agustín Rodríguez Sahagún. The insurgents' hope, in taking both the executive and legislative authorities prisoner, was to create a power vacuum that would force a new political order.

Almost at the same time, the Captain General of the Third Military Region, Jaime Milans del Bosch, joined the coup with a revolt in Valencia, ordering tanks to be brought out onto the streets and declaring a general state of emergency in an attempt to convince other senior military figures to align with him in supporting the coup. At 21:00 that evening, the Director of National Security Francisco Laína published a statement on RTVE announced that, under the instructions of King Juan Carlos I, a provisional government would be formed with the undersecretaries of different ministries in order to ensure State government in alliance with the Assembly of Military Chiefs of Staff (Junta de Jefes del Estado Mayor) and led by himself.

The coup was vehemently condemned by member countries of the EEC, especially since Spain was in preliminary negotiations for membership (eventually joining in 1986). Margaret Thatcher, Prime Minister of the UK, called the coup a "terrorist act." Alexander Haig, US Secretary of State, described the coup as an "internal affair".

Meanwhile, another insurgent general, Torres Rojas, failed in his attempt to oust General Juste from the Army's Armoured Division No. 1 "Brunete", resulting in Torres Rojas having to abandon his plan to take control of key strategic points in Madrid, including State radio and television headquarters and, therefore, firsthand control of the information as events unfolded.

Armada's soft coup
Originally, Armada, one of the coup's conspirators, had advocated a "milder" course of action, which he then proceeded to implement. Arriving at the Palace of Zarzuela, the royal residence, Armada offered the monarch a trade-off: the king would head a new "government of salvation" that would replace the democratically elected one in the hopes of appeasing Tejero and his forces and thereby avoiding a return to the full military dictatorship the conspirators were demanding.

The King, however, refused to receive Armada, who, shortly before midnight, entered the Congress of Deputies alleging that the King had ordered him to assume leadership of the government. As Armada was not the "competent military authority" that Tejero had been waiting for, the latter rejected Armada's claims with "My general, I didn't assault Congress for this" and, after that, ignored him.

Military occupation of Valencia
A simultaneous rebellion in eastern Spain fizzled. Shortly after Tejero took control of the Congress, Jaime Milans del Bosch, Captain General of the III Military Region, executed his part of the coup in Valencia. Deploying 2,000 men and fifty tanks from his Motorized Division as well as troops from the port of Valencia onto the streets and into the city center, they occupied the Town Hall (Ayuntamiento) and the Valencian judicial court building (Las cortes valencianas). The revolt, known as Operation Turia, was considered key if other military regions were to become involved in the coup. By 19:00, Valencian radio stations began broadcasting the state of emergency declared by Milans del Bosch, who was hoping to convince others to endorse his military action. Well into the night, Valencia was surrounded by armored military trucks and other troop units called in from the Bétera and Paterna army bases. Police snipers took their places on rooftops, military marches were played on loudspeakers and a curfew was imposed on the citizens. An armored convoy was dispatched to the Manises Air Base in order to convince the commander there to support the coup; however, the Colonel of the 11th Wing in charge of the base not only refused to comply, he threatened to deploy two fighter jets armed with air-to-ground missiles (which he claimed to have standing by with their engines running) against the tanks sent by Milans del Bosch, thereby forcing the latter to withdraw. This setback hinted the impending failure of the Madrid coup.

Juan Carlos's repudiation
King Juan Carlos refused to endorse the coup. The monarch, after protracted discussions with colleagues, was convinced of his military leaders' loyalty to himself and the Constitution. Two and a half hours after the seizure Juan Carlos phoned the president of the Government of Catalonia Jordi Pujol and assured him that everything was under control. Pujol, just before 22:00 that evening, made a short speech via national broadcasting stations inside and outside of Spain calling for peace. Until 1:00 in the morning (24 February), negotiations took place outside the Congress between the acting government as well as General Armada, who would later be relieved of his duties under suspicion that he had participated in planning the coup.

At 1:14 on 24 February, a speech by Juan Carlos was broadcast on national television, with the King wearing the uniform of the Captain General of the Armed Forces (Capitán General de los Ejércitos), the highest Spanish military rank, to oppose the coup and its instigators, defend the Spanish Constitution and disavow the authority of Milans del Bosch. In the speech recorded shortly before at the Palace of Zarzuela, he declared:

From that moment on, the coup was understood to be a failure.  Deputy Javier Solana stated that when he saw Tejero reading a special edition of the El País newspaper brought in by General Sáenz de Santamaría, which vehemently condemned the hostage situation inside the Congress, he knew that the coup had failed. For his part, Milans del Bosch, alone and thereafter isolated, abandoned his plans at 5:00 that morning and was arrested. Scores of civil guards clad in military fatigues attempted to jump out of the first floor window trying to flee. Others ran out the front door into the arms of officers who had surrounded the building through the night. The deputies were freed that morning after emerging one by one from their all night ordeal shouting "Long Live Freedom". Tejero resisted until midday on 24 February and was arrested outside the Congress building.

The event was made into a motion picture by Warner Bros. entitled 23F (Spanish nomenclature for 23 February, when the coup took place). Variety reviewer Jonathan Holland said the period detail of the film was good, but the film followed the officially sanctioned version and failed to scratch beneath the surface of what really happened.

Legacy

The most immediate consequence was that, as an institution, the Monarchy emerged from the failed coup with overwhelming legitimacy in the eyes of the public and the political class. In the long term, the coup's failure could be considered the last serious attempt by adherents to Francoist ideology to establish any long-term authority in the country.

The Supreme Court of Military Justice, known as the Campamento trial (juicio de Campamento), condemned Miláns del Bosch, Alfonso Armada and Antonio Tejero Molina to thirty years in prison as the key instigators of the coup d'état. Eventually, thirty people out of some 300 accused would be convicted for their involvement in the coup.

The extent of any civilian involvement in planning the coup has never been thoroughly investigated. Juan García Carrés, ex-leader of the Sindicato Vertical (the only legal trade union organisation in Francoist Spain), was the only civilian to be convicted.

After the events, the Socialist opposition agreed to a law, the LOAPA, to slow down the establishment of autonomous communities as envisaged in the Constitution, to placate the military.

The bullet holes in the ceiling of the Spanish parliament were retained as a reminder of the coup attempt.

Alternative theories
The bloodless yet apparently chaotic unravelling of the coup, the plethora of unanswered questions as to its unfolding, the staunch monarchist allegiance of two main conspirators (Armada and Milans del Bosch) and the King's lengthy absence before he finally made a late-night public television address have fueled skepticism and conspiracy theories during the Campamento trial and have remained active ever since.

These theories cast doubt on the sincerity of the King's defense of democracy and qualify the coup as an example of coercive realpolitik taken to the next level. In essence, this version of events alleges that the coup itself was orchestrated by the Spanish Secret Services in connivance with the King and the Royal House as well as representatives of the major political parties and mainstream media, among others. The plot's centerpiece and apparent motivation was the so-called Operation Armada, a "soft" coup modeled after Operation De Gaulle and aimed at a national-unity government headed by Armada himself, consisting of an array of ministers from all the main political parties. The first objective was to oust Prime Minister Suárez, who had been criticized relentlessly by the media and the political elite for months and was rumoured to have even lost the King's good graces, partly due to Suárez's ambitious reformist agenda which had, conceivably, gone off-script. The second objective of the purported "soft" coup was a consequence of the former: to hurry still-toddling Spanish public institutions into fulfilling the convergence criteria the nation was being groomed for, namely NATO and EEC membership and the consolidation of an effectively bipartisan and ideologically moderate parliamentary monarchy. According to the rationale behind the theory, this objective required both purging the armed forces of its most reactionary elements and frightening the common voter into accepting the monarchy and the two-party system as the institutional "default position".

Yet another and more concrete objective would have been to neutralize an imminent and "hard" coup d'état planned for later that year, most likely on 2 May. A major clique or sub-group among the instigators of this alleged coup was the so-called Colonels' group, headed by former SECED chief José Ignacio San Martín. Two reasons have been cited why this alleged plot was considered particularly dangerous: San Martín's intelligence connections, and the fact that it was colonels and lieutenant colonels, rather than generals, who had direct control over the troops

According to these theories, Prime Minister Suárez got wind of Operation Armada long in advance, hence his sudden resignation in order to avoid it—given that the coup was to occur during the motion of no confidence in his government, scheduled to take place some weeks later. The plan went forward in spite of Suárez's resignation, but Tejero's failure to understand its ramifications, his guileless belief that he was at the heart of a hardcore coup plot, the media field-day prompted by his violent entrance in congressional chambers (and his crass, uncouth demeanor and language, which was captured by microphones and cameras in the building and later ridiculed by the press) and his refusal to accept the multi-partisan government proposed by Armada, resulted in the simultaneous aborting of the "hard" and the "soft" coup plots by those who had planned them.

Former CESID Special Operations chief José Luis Cortina Prieto, one of the three military officers acquitted during the trial, plays an ubiquitous role in these theories, some of which place him as a major power player within the conspiracy as well as the man responsible for coalescing all the different coup plots into one and later neutralizing them simultaneously. Cortina, who graduated from the Zaragoza Academy in the same cohort as the King, had been appointed to the Joint Chiefs of Staff intelligence services during the Carrero administration and would later assist his brother in creating the Gabinete de Orientación y Documentación S. A. think tank, which would be the germ of the country's main conservative party. It has been alleged that during a lunch break in the 23-F trial, and after being subjected to a particularly intense grilling session by the prosecutor, Cortina grabbed a phone and was heard saying: "Como siga este tío así, saco a relucir lo de Carrero" ("if this guy keeps pressing me like this, I'll spill the beans about [what happened to] Carrero"). The prosecutor's questioning allegedly lost a great deal of intensity when court resumed after the lunch break, and Cortina was finally acquitted.

Arguably up until a  broadcast by laSexta, the work by Jesús Palacios and the book  by Pilar Urbano, these theses have never worked their way into mainstream consciousness, although innuendos and subtle implications were not unusual. Some of these implications may be involuntary. The King's authorized biography by José Luis de Vilallonga contains the following interview excerpt:If I were to carry out an operation in the King's name but without his consent, my first move would have been to isolate him from the rest of the world and prevent him from communicating with anyone on the outside. Well far from it: That night I could have entered and left my residence at will; and concerning phone lines, I received more calls in a few hours than I had received in a whole month! From my father, who was in Estoril (and was also very surprised to be able to contact me by phone), from my two sisters in Madrid, and from friendly heads of State who encouraged me to resist. Sabino Fernández Campo, chief of the Royal House, expunged this from the Spanish edition.

See also
 1982 Spanish coup d'état attempt
 January 6 United States Capitol attack, an incident which has drawn comparisons from some to the 1981 Spanish coup attempt. Others, such as historian Stanley G. Payne, have rejected the comparison, stating that they resemble each other "Only at the vaguest, most superficial level."
 List of attacks on legislatures
 Operación Galaxia, an earlier coup plan

References

Sources

Further reading
 23-F, the King and His Secret (23-F, el Rey y su secreto) by Jesús Palacios, 2010 – 
 23-F: The Coup That Never Existed (23-F: El Golpe Que Nunca Existio) by Amadeo Martinez Ingles, 2001 – 
 The Business of Liberty (El negocio de la libertad) by Jesús Cacho, 1999 – 
 The Coup: Anatomy and Keystones of the Assault on Congress (El Golpe: Anatomía y Claves Del Asalto Al Congreso) by Busquets, Julio, Miguel A. Aguilar, and Ignacio Puche, (Spanish, Ed. Ariel, 1981) (written a few days after the coup)
 Anatomy of a Moment (Anatomía de un Instante) by Javier Cercas (Spanish, Mondadori, 2009), (English, Bloomsbury, 2011)
 Diecisiete horas y media. El enigma del 23-F by Javier Fernández López (Spanish) editorial:TAURUS EDICIONES, 2000

External links
 TVE: 30 años del intento golpista: TVE's footage of the events (33 minutes)
 BBC News – On This Day 23 February – 1981: Rebel army seizes control in Spain (with video)
 King Orders army to crush coup, The Guardian, 23 February 1981
 Special from El Mundo
 SPAIN: King Juan Carlos (plot theories)

Attempted coups in Spain
Spain
Conflicts in 1981
Far-right politics in Spain
Spanish transition to democracy
1981 in Spain
Spanish coup d'état attempt
Juan Carlos I of Spain
Neo-fascist terrorist incidents
Spain
Battles and conflicts without fatalities